Long John Silver is a fictional character and the main antagonist in the novel Treasure Island (1883) by Robert Louis Stevenson.  The most colourful and complex character in the book, he continues to appear in popular culture. His missing leg and parrot, in particular, have greatly contributed to the image of the pirate in popular culture.

Profile 

Long John Silver is a cunning and opportunistic pirate who was quartermaster under the notorious Captain Flint. Stevenson's portrayal of Silver has greatly influenced the modern iconography of the pirate.

Long John Silver has a parrot, named Captain Flint in honor—or mockery—of his former captain, who generally perches on Silver's shoulder, and is known to chatter pirate or seafaring phrases like "Pieces of Eight", and "Stand by to go about." Silver uses the parrot as another means of gaining Jim's trust, by telling the boy all manner of exciting stories about the parrot's buccaneer history. 'Now that bird,' Silver would say, 'is, maybe, two hundred years old, Hawkins—they lives forever mostly, and if anybody's seen more wickedness it must be the devil himself. She's sailed with England—the great pirate Cap'n England. She's been at Madagascar, and at Malabar, and Surinam, and Providence, and Portobello... She was at the boarding of the Viceroy of the Indies out of Goa, she was, and to look at her you would think she was a baby."

Silver claims to have served in the Royal Navy and lost his leg under "the immortal Hawke". "His left leg was cut off close by the hip, and under the left shoulder, he carried a crutch, which he managed with wonderful dexterity, hopping about upon it like a bird. He was very tall and strong, with a face as big as a ham—plain and pale, but intelligent and smiling."

He also claims to have been the only man whom Flint ever feared. Like many of Stevenson's characters, there is significant duality in the character; ostensibly Silver is a hardworking and likeable seaman, and it is only as the plot unfolds that his villainous nature is gradually revealed. His relationship with Jim Hawkins, the novel's protagonist and narrator, belies that duality, as he serves as a mentor and eventually father-figure to Jim, creating much shock and emotion when it is discovered that he is in charge of the mutiny, and especially when Jim must confront and fight him later on.

Although treacherous and willing to change sides at any time to further his own interests, Silver has compensating virtues. He is wise enough to save his money, in contrast to the spendthrift ways of most of the pirates. He is physically courageous despite his disability: for instance, when Flint's cache is found to be empty, he coolly stands his ground against five murderous seamen despite having only Jim, a boy in his teens, to back him.

When Silver escapes at the end of the novel, he takes "three or four hundred guineas" of the treasure with him, thus becoming one of only two former members of Captain Flint's crew to get his hands on a portion of the recovered treasure. (The repentant maroonee Ben Gunn is the other, but he spends all £1,000 in nineteen days.) Jim's own ambivalence towards Silver is reflected in the last chapter, when he speculates that the old pirate must have settled down in comfortable retirement: "It is to be hoped so, I suppose, for his chances of comfort in another world are very small."

Silver is married to a woman of African descent, whom he trusts to manage his business affairs in his absence and to liquidate his Bristol assets when his actions make it impossible for him to go home. He confides in his fellow pirates that he and his wife plan to rendezvous after the voyage to Skeleton Island is complete and Flint's treasure is recovered, at which point Silver will retire to a life of luxury. Ironically his "share" of Flint's treasure (£420) is considerably less than that of Ben Gunn (£1,000) and what Silver boasts was his share from England (£900) and from Flint (£2,000).

According to Stevenson's letters, the idea for the character of Long John Silver was inspired by his real-life friend William Henley, a writer and editor. Stevenson's stepson, Lloyd Osbourne, described Henley as "...a great, glowing, massive-shouldered fellow with a big red beard and a crutch; jovial, astoundingly clever, and with a laugh that rolled like music; he had an unimaginable fire and vitality; he swept one off one's feet". In a letter to Henley after the publication of Treasure Island, Stevenson wrote: "I will now make a confession. It was the sight of your maimed strength and masterfulness that begot Long John Silver...the idea of the maimed man, ruling and dreaded by the sound, was entirely taken from you".

Adaptations and related works

Literature 
 A prequel novel to Treasure Island, titled Porto Bello Gold, was published in 1924 by Arthur D. Howden Smith.
 British historian Dennis Judd presents Silver as the main character in his 1977 prequel, The Adventures of Long John Silver, and in the 1979 sequel, Return to Treasure Island.
 John Silver is also the protagonist in Björn Larsson's fictional 1995 autobiography, Long John Silver: The True and Eventful History of My Life of Liberty and Adventure as a Gentleman of Fortune and Enemy to Mankind, published in Sweden in 1995.
 Silver is the main character in Edward Chupack's 2008 Silver — My Own Tale as Told by Me with a Goodly Amount of Murder.
 Silver is a minor character in Andrew Motion's 2012 novel "Silver: Return to Treasure Island", a sequel to the original book. Set many years after the end of the original, Silver is now half mad and blind, living in the company of his wife and daughter.
 In the Stephen King novel Firestarter, the main protagonist's father Andy McGee receives a psychic warning that his daughter has been deceived by a lead antagonist, the scarred assassin Rainbird, in the form of a vision of Silver.

Audio-radio 
 Orson Welles played Silver in a July 18, 1938, broadcast of The Mercury Theatre on the Air.
 Basil Rathbone starred as both The Narrator and Silver in a 1944 audio recording for Columbia Masterworks Records.
 William Redfield played Silver on the May 14, 1948 Your Playhouse of Favorites adaptation.
 Ronald Colman hosted an adaptation of the novel on the April 27, 1948, broadcast of Favorite Story.
 James Mason played Silver opposite Bobby Driscoll's "Jim Hawkins" on the Lux Radio Theatre'''s adaptation on January 29, 1951.
 James Kennedy played Silver in the Tale Spinners for Children audio adaptation of Treasure Island (United Artists Records, UAC 11013).
 There have been two BBC Radio adaptations of Treasure Island, with Silver being played by Peter Jeffrey in 1989, and Jack Shepherd in 1995.
 The author John le Carré performed an abridged reading of the novel in five parts as part of BBC Radio 4's Afternoon Reading.
 Tom Baker starred as Silver in Big Finish Productions' 2012 audio adaptation.

 Theatre 
There have been several major stage adaptations made. The number of minor adaptations remains countless.
 Starting in 1966, in London, there was an annual production of the musical Treasure Island, based on a book by Bernard Miles and Josephine Wilson. The music was composed by Cyril Ornadel and the lyrics by Hal Shaper. The musical was performed at the Mermaid Theatre, originally under the direction of Bernard Miles, who played Long John Silver, a part he also played in various television versions. Comedian Spike Milligan would often play Ben Gunn in these productions, and in 1981, Tom Baker played Long John Silver.
 Pieces of Eight, a musical adaptation by Jule Styne, premiered in Edmonton, Alberta, in 1985.
 Skatteøen, a Danish language musical adaptation by singer-songwriter Sebastian, premiered on Folketeatret, Copenhagen in 1986.
 In 2011, Tom Hewitt starred in B. H. Barry and Vernon Morris's stage adaptation of the novel, which officially opened 5 March at the Irondale Center in Brooklyn.
 In July 2011, Bristol Old Vic staged a large-scale outdoor production of Treasure Island outside the theatre on King Street, Bristol directed by Sally Cookson, with music by Benji Bower.
 From October 2013 to 2014, Mind the Gap Theatre Company held a national tour of Treasure Island, retold by Olivier award-winning writer Mike Kenny.
 In 2013, YouthPlays published Long Joan Silver by Arthur M. Jolly, an adaptation where all of the pirates are women.
 From December 2014 to April 2015, Arthur Darvill, played Silver in the National Theatre production of Treasure Island adapted by Bryony Lavery and directed by Polly Findlay
The Broadway musical SpongeBob SquarePants: The Broadway Musical features the character in the song "Poor Pirates".
 As part of their 2017 season, the Stratford Festival of Canada premiered a new adaptation of Treasure Island by Canadian playwright Nicolas Billon.

 Film 

 Charles Ogle played Silver in the 1920 silent film.
 Wallace Beery was the first speaking Long John Silver in the 1934 film also starring Lionel Barrymore.
 Robert Newton became an iconic Long John Silver in Disney's 1950 live-action film.
The 1954 film, Long John Silver, again starred Robert Newton as the title character, which he would reprise in television (see below).
 The 1971 anime film depicts Silver as an anthropomorphic pig who captains his own pirate ship, sporting a hook prosthesis on his left hand rather than a missing leg.
 In 1971, Boris Andreyev played Silver in the Soviet version Ostrov sokrovishch.
 Orson Welles portrayed Silver in the 1972 live action film adaptation.
 In the 1988 Soviet animated film adaptation, Armen Dzhigarkhanyan provided the voice talent for John Silver.
 In the 1994 movie The Pagemaster, the character of Silver is voiced by Jim Cummings.
 Tim Curry portrays Long John Silver in Disney's 1996 Muppets musical film adaptation.
 Jack Palance, in one of his last film appearances, portrays Silver in the 1999 film.
 Silver is voiced by Brian Murray and depicted as a cyborg in the Disney 2002 animated science fiction adventure film Treasure Planet.
 Lance Henriksen played Silver in the 2006 film Pirates of Treasure Island.
 Tobias Moretti played Silver in the 2007 German film adaptation of Treasure Island, entitled Die Schatzinsel.
 In the film Solo: A Star Wars Story (2018), the character of Tobias Beckett (played by Woody Harrelson) was inspired by Long John Silver.

 Television 
 Robert Newton followed up his two feature films with a 1955 Australian-produced television series The Adventures of Long John Silver.
 Peter Wyngarde played Silver in the 1958 TV series The Adventures of Ben Gunn.
 BBC Television has presented the story in miniseries format four times, with the role of Silver being played by Bernard Miles in 1951 and again in 1957;, Peter Vaughan in 1968; and Alfred Burke in 1977. Miles played the role one final time in a 1982 TV movie.
 In 1959, Ivo Garrani played Silver in an Italian television miniseries.
 Ivor Dean played the character in an acclaimed European four-part mini-series in 1966. He intended to reprise the role in another series with more adventures of Silver and began writing it with director Robert S. Baker, but his sudden death in 1974 stopped all further plans. In 1985, the Ivor Dean script was used as foundation for the Disney 10-part TV series Return to Treasure Island, starring Brian Blessed as Long John Silver.
 In the 1978 anime series Takarajima directed by Osamu Dezaki the character is voiced by Genzō Wakayama.
 A 1982 Soviet miniseries had Silver portrayed by Oleg Borisov.
 Anthony Quinn played Silver in the 1987 television miniseries Treasure Island in Outer Space.
 Charlton Heston portrayed a darker Long John Silver in the 1990 made-for-television movie, Treasure Island.
 Eddie Izzard played Long John Silver in the 2012 Sky mini-series.
 Luke Arnold played John Silver in the Starz television series Black Sails (2014–2017), a prequel story set 20 years before Treasure Island. In this series, Silver as a young man begins as a scheming cook who rises to serve as quartermaster on the Walrus and on a captured Spanish Man O' War, later to lead the pirate and former-slave forces that attempt to re-take Nassau from the British. Reflecting his relationship with Jim Hawkins, Silver intends only to use his crewmates to enrich himself, but comes to care for them despite himself. At one point, a rival pirate crew captures the Man O' War but, being too few to sail the ship themselves, ask Silver for a list of crew members who can be counted on to shift their loyalties, intending to execute the rest. Silver refuses, and the pirates torture him by repeatedly striking his leg with an axe. The Walrus' crew free themselves and rescue him, but his leg is beyond saving and has to be amputated. He loses consciousness, and wakes to find that a grateful and impressed crew has voted him quartermaster.
 Costas Mandylor portrays "Captain Silver" in the 2016 episode "The Brothers Jones" on ABC's Once Upon a Time.

 Other print media 
 A Ballad of John Silver, a poem by John Masefield, was published in 1921.
 Long John Silver is a Franco-Belgian comics series written by Xavier Dorison and illustrated by Mathieu Laufray which was published in French and English.
 John Silver, a fictional space pirate with mechanical leg who appears in the Italian comic book Nathan Never, was inspired by Long John Silver.

 Other 
 In May 1960 The Silver Beetles (later to become known as The Beatles) were backing a young musician Johnny Gentle, during his tour through Scotland. For the duration of this tour the whole band decided to give themselves pseudonyms. Band member John Lennon became Long John for this occasion. 
 The rock band Jefferson Airplane created an album in 1972 named Long John Silver.
 A fast-food seafood restaurant chain, Long John Silver's, is named after the character.
One of the main characters from the video game Cyberpunk 2077 is called Johnny Silverhand, which is in reference to John Silver.

 References 

 Bibliography 
 
 Elwin, Malcolm (1939). Old Gods Falling. New York: The Macmillan Company. .
 Prince, Alison (1994). Kenneth Grahame: An Innocent in the Wild Wood. London: Allison & Busby. .
 Karg, Barbara; Spaite, Arjean (2007). The Everything Pirates Book: A Swashbuckling History of Adventure on the High Seas. Avon, MA: Adams Media. .
 Jolly, Arthur M (2013). Long Joan Silver. Los Angeles: YouthPLAYS, Inc. .

 Further reading 
 Stevenson, Robert Louis; Colvin, Sidney, Sir (1899). Letters to his family and friends. New York: Charles Scribner's Sons. .

 External links 

 John Silver on IMDb
 Treasure Island on The Mercury Theatre on the Air: July 18, 1938
 Basil Rathbone stars in Treasure Island: Columbia Masterworks, 1944
 Treasure Island on Lux Radio Theatre'': January 29, 1951
 Download Treasure Island on Tale Spinners for Children
 The 1989 BBC Radio Treasure Island on Archive.org
 John Masefield's 'A Ballad of John Silver' set to music

Adventure film characters
Fictional amputees
Literary characters introduced in 1883
Fictional chefs
Fictional English people
Fictional people from the 18th-century
Fictional sea pirates
Fictional quartermasters
Fictional Royal Navy personnel
Male literary villains
Male characters in animation
Male characters in film
Male characters in literature
Male characters in television
Treasure Island characters